The 1909 Marshall Thundering Herd football team represented Marshall College (now Marshall University) in the 1909 college football season. Marshall posted a 3–2–1 record, outscoring its opposition 107–95. Home games were played on a campus field called "Central Field" which is presently Campus Commons.

Schedule

References

Marshall
Marshall Thundering Herd football seasons
Marshall Thundering Herd football